Norman Cyrus Skogstad (July 18, 1920 – May 12, 2001) was a United States Army Air Forces flying ace and a leading pilot in the Mediterranean Theater of Operations during World War II.

Early life
Norman Cyrus Skogstad was the son of  Otis Skogstad (1886–1965) and Mabel (Simonson) Skogstad (1892–1979) of Barron, Wisconsin. He graduated from St. Olaf College in Northfield, Minnesota.

World War II
He served in the Army Air Corps in World War II with the 307th Fighter Squadron.  He began his overseas service in June 1944 as a first lieutenant.  By the end of the war, he was a captain and the leader of a squadron. As an ace, Skogstad had 12 confirmed kills, piloting a P-51.  His first occurred August 7, 1944 in Blechhammer, Poland where he destroyed two enemy aircraft.  On August 18, 1944, he destroyed two Messerschmitt Bf 109s over Ploiești, Romania.  Ten days later in Austria, he destroyed one transport.  On September 2, 1944, he was credited with destroying one Junkers Ju 52.  On December 17, 1944, he was credited with destroying two Focke-Wulf Fw 190s over Blechhammer, Poland.  His last confirmed kills occurred on March 25, 1945 where he destroyed four Fw 190s over Olomouc, Moravia. From August 12 to 16, 1944, he flew in support of Operation Dragoon, the Allied invasion of southern France.

Norman C. Skogstad was awarded the European–African–Middle Eastern Campaign Medal with seven battle stars, the ATO anti-submarine patrol decoration, the Purple Heart, the Air Medal with 17 clusters, and the Distinguished Flying Cross. He also earned the Presidential Unit and Silver Star for gallantry.

After the war
He was an accomplished trial attorney and practiced law for 35 years. He retired in 1982. His wife, Marilynn Carlson Skogstad (1923–1999), died August 30, 1999. Norman Skogstad died on May 12, 2001 at the age of 80 and was buried in Washington Park East Cememtery, Indianapolis, Indiana. He had five children: Leif, Britt, Sigrid Luther, Ingrid Dinsmore, and Lisa Skogstad.

References

1920 births
2001 deaths
American World War II flying aces
Recipients of the Distinguished Flying Cross (United States)
Recipients of the Silver Star
Recipients of the Air Medal
United States Army Air Forces officers
United States Army Air Forces pilots of World War II
People from Barron, Wisconsin
St. Olaf College alumni
American people of Norwegian descent
American Lutherans
20th-century Lutherans
Military personnel from Wisconsin